Sadik Warfa was a member of the Somalia parliament and the former Minister for Labor and Social Affairs during khaire tenure. Member of Parliament of Somalia Secretary General of the Defense Committee Mogadishu, Somalia. 
Sadik is a dual citizen(Somalian, American) and he comes from the Leelkase Tanade, a sub-clan of the Darod clan.

As an activist his passion is to bring people together for the common good. 
Sadik Warfa was elected in 2016 as a member of the Parliament of Somalia and Secretary General of the Defense Committee. In his role as a member of Parliament, Sadik was instrumental in drafting and passing the Pensions and Gratuity Bill for the Somali Armed Forces.
He is also the founder and Executive Director of Fagaaraha Forum, a town hall meeting format that provided critical dialogue and consensus about critical issues facing Somalis in the United States, elsewhere abroad and in the Homeland of Somalia. He conducted multiple town hall forums in Nairobi, Somalia, Minneapolis, Toronto, London, Amsterdam and Columbus, Ohio.
Sadik Warfa was elected as Deputy Director of Somali Diaspora at the June 2014 Diaspora Conference held in Istanbul, Turkey. He was Executive Director of Somail Diaspora. The aim of Global Somali Diaspora is to safe- guard the rights, dignity, connections and cultural values of Somali Diaspora communities around the world.
He received his master's degree in Public Administration with specialization in Public Management from Mankato State University. For his undergraduate studies he attended the University of Minnesota/Twin Cities majoring in and receiving a BA in Political Science and Management.
Sadik effectively advocated for the rights of Somali-American at the local community, state and federal levels. He passionately promoted the rights of Somali-Americans in Minnesota and counseled families associated with arrests and incarceration of family members as seen on local and national television news outlets.
 
A seasoned grassroots organizer, he coordinated campaigns throughout Minnesota and helped political candidates on both state and federal levels in their efforts to make substantive change. He recently served as Chairman of Ventura Village neighborhood in South Minneapolis while working as an independent financial and economic consultant.
Founder and Executive Director of Fagaaraha: 2012–Present.
• Developed successful Town Hall Meeting forum to discuss issues of great importance to Somalis around the world who are interested and concerned with issues and events related to our home country.
June- 2014- June 2016 Global Somali Diaspora
• Elected as Deputy Director of the Global Somali Diaspora (GSD) at the June 2014 Diaspora Conference held in Istanbul, Turkey. The aim of GSD is to safe-guard the rights, dignity, connections and cultural values of Somali Diaspora communities around the world.
Jan- 2002-June 2016 Somali Community of Minnesota: Community Activist/Organizer
Sadik advocates for the rights of Somali-American at the local community, state and federal levels. He continuously promotes the rights of Somali-Americans here in Minnesota and has counseled families associated with arrests and incarceration of family members as seen on local news outlets.
Coordinated campaigns throughout Minnesota and helped political candidates on both state and federal levels in their efforts to make substantive change. Sadik has tirelessly advocated for the rights of Somali-American at the local community, state and federal levels. He assisted family members of those arrested and incarcerated when they were charged with crimes affecting the community.
In 2010, he campaigned for Minnesota's State Representative District 61A seat. His campaign was about real reform and creative solutions. He was the first Somali- American to compete for any state legislative seats. Then in 2011, SadikI competed for a Minnesota State Senate District 61 seat in a special election and came in second in the six-person Democrat primary.

References

Year of birth missing (living people)
Living people
Members of the Federal Parliament of Somalia